Sir Thomas Edward Colebrooke, 4th Baronet (19 August 1813 – 11 January 1890), who was known as Sir Edward Colebrooke, was a British politician.

Early life and education

Edward was born in Calcutta, the second son of Henry Thomas Colebrooke and Elizabeth (née Wilkinson) Colebrooke. He and his elder brother George Vernon went to Eton College. He then attended the East India Company College at Hertford Heath, Hertfordshire in preparation for appointment to a post in India with the East India Company.

India
Colebrooke arrived in India in June 1832 and worked in Allahabad, leaving India on 9 October 1835 and arriving home in London in January 1836 to comfort his father following the unexpected death of his elder brother.

Colebrooke baronetcy

Edward's brother George died on 9 February 1835 and his father in January 1837, leaving Edward heir to the Colebrooke baronetcy which he inherited in 1838 on the death of his uncle, Sir James Edward Colebrooke.

Career

Colebrooke was Liberal Member of Parliament (MP) for Taunton 1842–1852, Lanarkshire 1857–1868 and North Lanarkshire 1868–1885. He stood unsuccessfully as a liberal Unionist of North East Lanarkshire in 1886.

He was Lord Lieutenant of Lanarkshire 1869–1890.

Colebrooke went to live in Ottershaw, Surrey in 1859. He provided sufficient land from his estate for a church, churchyard and vicarage, paid all the construction costs and endowed the church with £100 per year.

He was Dean of Faculties at the University of Glasgow from 1869 to 1872 and was awarded an honorary LLD in 1873.

He was President of the Royal Asiatic Society from 1864 to 1866, from 1875 to 1877 and in 1881.

Marriage and family
He married Elizabeth Margaret Richardson, second daughter of John Richardson, at St Paul's Church, Knightsbridge, on 15 January 1857.

They had six children, of whom five survived into adulthood:  
 Margaret Ginevra, born on 19 November 1857. She married the Marchese di Camugliano-Niccolini on 17 November 1890; they had no children
 Henry, born on 3 November 1858; died on 1 May 1859, to whom Christ Church, Ottershaw is believed to have been built as a memorial 
 Helen Emma (known as Nelly), born in 1860; died on 21 January 1916.
 Edward Arthur (known as Ned), born on 12 October 1861, who after his father's death in 1890 inherited the baronetcy
 Mary Elizabeth (known as Molly), born on 21 May 1863; died on 2 October 1951. She married Edmund Henry Byng on 17 December 1894 and they had two children
 Roland, born on 22 July 1864; died on 19 January 1910.

Death
Sir Edward Colebroke died on 11 January 1890 at his London home, aged 76. His wife, Lady Elizabeth, died on 26 October 1896.

Notes and references

Sources
 Binns, Sheila (2014): Sir Edward Colebrooke of Abington and Ottershaw, Baronet and Member of Parliament: The Four Lives of an Extraordinary Victorian, Grosvenor House Publishing Ltd,

Further reading
 Athersuch, John (2010): An Illustrated History of Ottershaw Park Estate, 1761–2011, Peacock Press,

External links 
 

1813 births
1890 deaths
Baronets in the Baronetage of Great Britain
Edward
Liberal Unionist Party parliamentary candidates
Lord-Lieutenants of Lanarkshire
Members of the Parliament of the United Kingdom for English constituencies
Members of the Parliament of the United Kingdom for Scottish constituencies
People educated at Eton College
People from Kolkata
People from Ottershaw
Presidents of the Royal Asiatic Society
Scottish Liberal Party MPs
UK MPs 1841–1847
UK MPs 1847–1852
UK MPs 1857–1859
UK MPs 1859–1865
UK MPs 1865–1868
UK MPs 1868–1874
UK MPs 1874–1880
UK MPs 1880–1885